Connecticut Department of Public Safety v. Doe, 538 U.S. 1 (2003), was a United States Supreme Court case regarding the constitutionality of the Connecticut sex offender registration requirement which required public disclosure of information on sex offenders after they had been released from incarceration.

Background 
A state statute required Connecticut's Department of Public Safety (PDS) to collect information gathered from sex offenders who registered into a sex offender registry and publicize it on an Internet website and to make the registry available to the public in specific state offices, as Connecticut's version of Megan's Law.

The website contained the following disclaimer:

John Doe, a convicted sex offender who was thereby subject to the law, filed suit in Federal court, claiming that the law violates the Fourteenth Amendment's Due Process Clause. The District Court issued an injunction regarding  the law's public disclosure provisions. The Court of Appeals affirmed, concluding  that such disclosure did indeed violate the Due Process Clause of the Fourteenth Amendment  because registrants were not provided Doe with a  hearing prior to the public disclosure.

The Supreme Court granted  certiorari to determine whether the United States Court of Appeals for the Second Circuit was correct in enjoining the public disclosure of Connecticut's sex offender registry.

Opinion of the Court 
In a unanimous opinion, the Second Circuit Court's judgment was reversed on the basis that due process does not require the opportunity to prove a fact that is not material to the State's statutory scheme. Injury to reputation in itself, even if defamatory, does not constitute deprivation of liberty.

References

Further reading

External links
 
 Brief for the Unisted States as Amicus Curiae Supporting Petitioner
 ACLU Brief for the Respondents in Connecticut Dept. of Public Safety v. Doe (10/2/2002)
 Amicus brief in Connecticut Dept. of Public Safety v. Doe  -  Urging the court to find that governmental dissemination of truthful information about a person does not trigger "due process" requirements.

United States Supreme Court cases
United States criminal due process case law
Sex offender registration
2003 in United States case law
United States Supreme Court cases of the Rehnquist Court
Sex offender registries in the United States